The 1933–34 season was the 39th season of competitive football by Southampton, and the club's 12th in the Second Division of the Football League. The season was another mediocre campaign for the Saints, who finished in the bottom half of the Second Division table for the fifth time since joining the league. The club equalled their Football League record of 15 home wins from 21 games, but failed to win a single away fixture all season, continuing a club record run of 33 games without an away which started late the last season and continued until December 1934. Despite starting the season strongly and spending months in the top half of the table, Southampton finished the 1933–34 season in 14th place with 15 wins, eight draws and 19 losses, just five points above Millwall in the first relegation spot.

In the 1933–34 FA Cup, Southampton entered the third round with a home fixture against Third Division South side Northampton Town. After a 1–1 draw at The Dell, the Saints lost by a single goal in the replay at the County Ground, exiting the tournament without a win for a club record seventh season running. As in the previous year, the club ended the season against local First Division rivals Portsmouth in a single game for the Hampshire Benevolent Cup and Rowland Hospital Cup, which they lost 4–1 at home. In the semi-final of the third annual Hampshire Combination Cup, they also lost 1–0 to Pompey, who had thrashed them 6–0 at the same stage the previous season. Southampton played just one additional friendly match during the 1933–34 campaign, beating divisional rivals Fulham 2–1 at home in January.

Southampton used 22 different players during the 1933–34 season and had thirteen different goalscorers. Their top scorer was centre-forward Ted Drake, who scored 22 goals in the Second Division and one in the FA Cup before he left the club to join Arsenal in March. Inside-forward Arthur Holt scored six times in the league, followed by Norman Cole – who took Drake's place in the regular lineup after his transfer – on five league goals in just ten appearances. Ten players were signed by the club during the campaign, with seven released and sold to other clubs. The average attendance at The Dell during the 1933–34 season was 10,008. The highest attendance of the season was 24,797 against Fulham on 26 December 1933. The lowest attendance was 3,396 against Swansea Town on 5 February 1934.

Background and transfers
After the end of the 1932–33 season, Southampton manager George Kay sold several players. In May, amateur forward Bill Charlton joined divisional rivals Fulham, while former Cottagers left-back Arthur Tilford returned to the club after three months at the South Coast side. Frank Osborne also left the Saints after a season playing for the reserve side, retiring from football until returning as a director at Fulham a few years later. Backup goalkeeper Bob Foster joined Third Division North side Wrexham in June, while outside-left Jimmy Harris was sold to Aylesford Paper Mills. The club also signed several new players. In June, versatile forward Fred Tully joined from top-flight side Aston Villa, and in August half-back Johnny McIlwaine returned after a year at Welsh side Llanelli. During the summer, the club also signed winger Norman Catlin from Arsenal, full-back Frank Ward from Preston North End, and inside-forward Ted Withers from Clark's College, all on amateur terms initially.

Shortly after the start of the season, Southampton signed outside-left Ben Burley from First Division side Sheffield United, centre-forward Vivian Gibbins from Third Division South club Bristol Rovers, and wing-half Henry Long from Hampshire League side Ryde Sports. In October, outside-right Fred Dunmore was sold to Blyth Spartans, and the following month inside-right Joe Cummins and amateur goalkeeper Eugene Bernard were signed. The most notable transfer of the season, however, took place late in the campaign when Ted Drake was sold to First Division title challengers Arsenal. Drake had previously rejected an approach from the Gunners, but moved to the club after a second offer in March 1934, breaking Southampton's transfer record with his fee of £6,000. At the time, Drake was the top scorer in the Second Division with 22 goals; in the ten games he played for Arsenal before the end of the season, he scored seven league goals to help them win the championship.

Players transferred in

Players transferred out

Players released

Players retired

Second Division

Southampton started the 1933–34 season strongly, picking up three wins in their first five games to secure a place in the top three of the Second Division league table. Centre-forward Ted Drake quickly established himself as the division's top scorer with eight goals in the opening five games, including a hat-trick on the opening day 4–1 win over Bradford City. The club's poor form away from home continued throughout the season, with only their strong home record keeping them safe from relegation. The Saints quickly slipped into the bottom half of the table, and by the end of 1933 were struggling in 13th place. Drake was sent off in a 3–1 loss at Grimsby Town on 9 December, becoming the first Southampton player to be dismissed in the league since Jerry Mackie on the opening day of the 1929–30 season.

The club failed to win a single game away from home during the 1933–34 league campaign, combining with the last two away fixtures of the previous season and the first ten of the next in the club's longest league sequence without an away win (33 matches in total). After top scorer Ted Drake was sold to First Division side Arsenal for a new Southampton club record fee of £6,000 in March 1934, the Saints continued to struggle in the bottom six places of the table, dropping as low as 17th after a run of seven games with just one win. Three more home wins in April – against Blackpool, West Ham United and Grimsby Town – ensured that the club survived relegation to the Third Division South; Southampton finished 14th in the league table with 15 wins (all at home, equalling the club record), eight draws and 19 losses.

List of match results

Final league table

Results by matchday

FA Cup

Southampton were drawn in the third round of the 1933–34 FA Cup against Third Division South side Northampton Town at The Dell. The Cobblers opened the scoring after 25 minutes and held onto their lead until half-time, before Ted Drake equalised four minutes after the break to force a replay at the County Ground four days later. Northampton, described by Southampton club historians as "much the better team on the day", defeated the visiting Saints by a single goal, eliminating them in the third round for the sixth season in a row, extending the club's worst run in the tournament.

Other matches
Outside of the league and the FA Cup, Southampton played three additional first-team matches during the 1933–34 season. The first was the semi-final of the third annual Hampshire Combination Cup against local rivals Portsmouth on 22 November at Fratton Park. The First Division hosts eliminated the visiting Saints for a second season, with John Wallbanks scoring the only goal after 20 minutes. The club's only friendly match of the season took place on 27 January 1934, with Southampton beating divisional rivals Fulham 2–1 thanks to goals from Ted Drake and Arthur Holt. At the end of the season, Southampton and Portsmouth met again for the combined Hampshire Benevolent Cup and Rowland Hospital Cup. Pompey, having just finished as runners-up in the FA Cup, beat the Second Division hosts 4–1 thanks to goals from Septimus Rutherford, Jack Weddle, Jack Smith and Fred Worrall. Fred Tully scored the only goal for Southampton, "scarcely a minute" after Rutherford's opener.

Player details
Southampton used 22 different players during the 1933–34 season, thirteen of whom scored during the campaign. The team played in a 2–3–5 formation throughout, using two full-backs, three half-backs, two outside forwards, two inside forwards and a centre-forward. Outside-right Dick Neal appeared in all but one of the club's league games during the campaign, while Arthur Roberts, Bill Adams and Stan Woodhouse all played in 39 of the 42 games in the Second Division. Centre-forward Ted Drake finished as the season's top scorer with 20 goals in the Second Division, followed by inside-forward Arthur Holt on six goals, then Norman Cole and Fred Tully on five each. Frank Campbell was the highest-scoring half-back of the season, with three goals during the league campaign.

Squad statistics

Most appearances

Top goalscorers

Footnotes

References

Bibliography

External links
Southampton F.C. official website

Southampton F.C. seasons
Southampton